Alessandro De Stefani (1 January 1891 – 13 May 1970) was an Italian screenwriter. He wrote for 90 films between 1918 and 1962.

Selected filmography

 Maciste on Vacation (1921)
 Paradise (1932)
 The Table of the Poor (1932)
 Your Money or Your Life (1932)
 Fanny (1933)
 Together in the Dark (1933)
Nini Falpala (1933)
 My Little One (1933)
 They've Kidnapped a Man (1938)
 Castles in the Air (1939)
 The Knight of San Marco (1939)
 The Siege of the Alcazar (1940)
 The Daughter of the Green Pirate (1940)
 Then We'll Get a Divorce (1940)
 The First Woman Who Passes (1940)
 The Three Pilots (1942)
Bengasi (1942)
 The Mute of Portici (1952)
 Storms (1953)
 Woman of the Red Sea (1953)
 Maddalena (1954)
 The Adventures of Nicholas Nickleby (1958, TV series)

References

External links
 
 

1891 births
1970 deaths
20th-century Italian screenwriters
Italian male screenwriters
People from Friuli-Venezia Giulia
20th-century Italian male writers